Lake Matagami is a lake in Jamésie, in Nord-du-Québec, in Quebec, in Canada. It is located just north-northeast of the town of Matagami.

Geography 
Located in a marshy area of northern Quebec, the lake created by the meeting of the rivers Allard, Bell, Gouault, the Canet and Waswanipi.

History 
Matagami Lake has long been used as a transportation route in the fur trade from the 18th century to the 20th century by the Hudson's Bay Company.

Toponymy 

In Cree, "matagami" means "meeting of waters", in reference to the large rivers that join.

See also 
Nottaway River, a watercourse
Gouault River, a watercourse
Allard River, a watercourse
Bell River, a watercourse
Waswanipi River, a watercourse
Canet River, a watercourse
James Bay
Matagami, Quebec

Notes and references 

Lakes of Nord-du-Québec